Filipina singer-songwriter KC Concepcion has released two studio albums, 4 singles and 4 music videos. Concepcion has sold more than 7 thousand albums and over a million digital download in the Philippines alone. KC signed a record deal with Star Records and Sony Music in 2008 and released her eponymous debut album in the same year. In the Philippines, "a.k.a Cassandra" peak at number 1 on the iTunes, MyMusicStore, Astrovision, Oddysey and other OPM charts. and was certified platinum by the Philippine Association of the Record Industry (PARI). The album produced two singles, all of which charted within the top twenty in the Pinoy Myx Countdown Philippines. "Imposible" eponymous debut single has made Philippine music history which marked 1 million downloads online.

KC released her second studio album, KC, in 2010. The album peaked at number one on the OPM charts. KC also produced two singles. "Not Like The Movies" (2010), the first single from KC became Concepcion's best-charting song at the time, peaking at number one on OPM charts and radio charts.

Concepcion also appeared on various movie soundtrack for her movies For the First Time, When I Met You and Forever and a Day." Concepcion is currently signed with Star Records and Sony Music for another yet to come unannounced third studio album.

Albums

Studio albums

Soundtrack

Singles

Music videos

References

Discographies of Filipino artists